Wernya rufifasciata is a moth in the family Drepanidae. It was described by Yoshimoto in 1987. It is found in Taiwan.

References

Moths described in 1987
Thyatirinae
Moths of Taiwan